Pornosonic is a project by Don Argott inspired by the style of music in adult films. Two albums have been released.

Concept
The albums claim to be soundtracks from non-existent unreleased porn movies, but they are modern creations. Famous adult film actor Ron Jeremy was to hired by Mini Mace Pro Records to perform voice overs.

Reissued in 2000 and  2004.

Unreleased 70s Porno Music

Track listing
 Dick Dagger's Theme From Dick Dagger's Big Dick Dilemma
 Cramming for College From Cramming for College
 Nice n' Sleazy Does It From "If It Ain't Easy It Ain't Sleazy"
 Spiderpussy From Spiderpussy
 Special Delivery  From A Happy Ass
 Sex Starved Secretaries From Takin' Dictation
 Prepare for Take Off From Mile High Club
 Her Magic Carpet From Donna Does DeNise
 Laying Pipe From Plumber's DeLight
 Spiderpussy (Slight Return) From Spiderpussy 2: Caught in the Web

Personnel
D. Mason Bendewald — backing vocals
Laura Shepherd — backing vocals 
Jarred Alterman — bass, piano (clavinova)
Rob Giglio — drums
Benjamin Shwartz — flute
Don Argott — guitar
Mike Viggiani — guitar
Nancy Falcow — lead vocals (track 10) 
Dan McKinney — organ
Nick Kendall — percussion, violin
Daniel Lee — trumpet
Jo Hewitt — vocals

Cream Streets

Track listing
 Dream Streets (Theme)
 Peach Fuzz
 Dick Goes Down
 Dirty Pimp (Cum Lin's Theme)
 Putana Rodriguez
 Deep Inside Peach
 Get Peach Fuzz
 Peach Pie
 In the Way of Dick
 Dreaming of Dick
 Dick Creeps In
 Dick Saves Peach
 Cream Streets (Outro)
 Dick Dagger's Theme ('76 Remix)
 Cream Streets (Trailer)

Personnel
Don Argott — composer, cover design, guitar, primary artist, producer, talk box  
D. Mason Bendewald — producer  
Billy Blaise — saxophone  
Mark Brodzik — cover painting  
Mike Comstock — engineer, mixing  
Rob Giglio — drums  
Nick Kendall — percussion  
Joey Kilrain — logo design  
Jesse Kramer — drums  
Dan McKinney — organ (Hammond), electric piano, synthesizer  
Dave Smith — flute

Reception
Hal Horowitz from AllMusic valued it as "an enjoyable disc to play spot the influences with", and described it as "expertly played, engaging music that succeeds in spite of its nudge-wink approach". CMJ New Music Report described it as an "elaborate fake".

References

External links

American instrumental musical groups
Pornography
Musical groups established in 1999